The seventh season of the Kannada-language version of Indian reality television series Bigg Boss premiered on 13 October 2019. Sudeep returned as the host of the show for the seventh time.

Shine Shetty emerged victorious of this popular show, based on the votes given by the viewers. The winner was awarded a cash prize of 50 lakhs with an additional 11 lakh from other various sponsors, with a Tata Altroz car, for the first time in Bigg Boss Kannada history.

Deepika Das returned to compete in Season 9 .

Production 
On Day 1, 18 contestants entered the Bigg Boss House. Due to show's popularity and more contestants in the house, the show was extended to another two weeks instead of the regular 98 days format and this season is the Second longest season in the Bigg Boss Kannada Version as compared to previous seasons.

Housemates 
Following are the housemates who entered the Bigg Boss Kannada Season 7:

 Original Entrant
 Re Entrant
 Wild Card Entrant

Nominations table 

  indicates that the Housemate was directly nominated for eviction.
  indicates that the Housemate was immune prior to nominations.
  indicates the contestant has been evicted.
  indicates the contestant walked out due to emergency.
  indicates the contestant has been ejected.
  indicates the house captain.

Nomination notes
 : During this week's nominations, the House Captain had a special power to directly nominate one of the non-nominated housemates.
 : In Week 6, the nominations took place on Day 35 before the Captaincy Task. And on Day 36, the House Captain was given a special power to directly nominate one of the non-nominated housemates.
 : In Week 7, housemates were allowed to distribute five nomination points between their two nominations, with a maximum of four points to be allocated to one housemate. 
 : In Week 13, though the nominations took place, the voting lines were closed as the next week (Week 14) was announced as double eviction week.

Cross Over Episode

References

Bigg Boss Kannada
Kannada 7
2019 Indian television seasons
Colors Kannada original programming
Kannada-language television shows